Prachinburi United Football Club (Thai สโมสรฟุตบอลปราจีนบุรี ยูไนเต็ด) is a Thai semi professional football club based in Prachinburi province. They currently play in 2018 Thailand Amateur League Eastern Region.

Timeline
History of events of Prachinburi United Football Club

Stadium and locations

Season by season record

P = Played
W = Games won
D = Games drawn
L = Games lost
F = Goals for
A = Goals against
Pts = Points
Pos = Final position

QR1 = First Qualifying Round
QR2 = Second Qualifying Round
R1 = Round 1
R2 = Round 2
R3 = Round 3
R4 = Round 4

R5 = Round 5
R6 = Round 6
QF = Quarter-finals
SF = Semi-finals
RU = Runners-up
W = Winners

Honours
Regional League Central-East Division
 Winners (1) : 2014

References

External links
 Official Website of Prachinburi United
 Official Facebookpage of Prachinburi United

Association football clubs established in 2010
Football clubs in Thailand
Prachinburi province
2010 establishments in Thailand